The Tulse Luper Suitcases is a multimedia project by film maker and artist Peter Greenaway, initially intended to comprise four films, a 16-episode TV series, and 92 DVDs, as well as websites, CD-ROMs and books. The project  documented the imagined life of a fictional character called Tulse Luper. 

In the online component of the project, web designers competed to make a game based on the interactive site, The Tulse Luper Journey. The winner took a trip following Tulse Luper's travels: subsequent to this, a final feature film was released.

Films / DVDs 
Three films, The Tulse Luper Suitcases, Part 1: The Moab Story, The Tulse Luper Suitcases, Part 2: Vaux to the Sea, and The Tulse Luper Suitcases, Part 3: From Sark to the Finish were released from 2003. They were shown out of sequence, with Part 1 released in 2003, Part 3 in early 2004 and Part 2 in summer 2004. Part 1 was entered into the 2003 Cannes Film Festival.

All three were initially released only on DVD, allegedly to provide back-story material for  designers working on the website's 'suitcases'. These were chosen from submissions in a contest held in 2004. The trilogy was released as a box set in Australia in 2008. There are also two books, Tulse Luper in Turin and Tulse Luper in Venice, published in 2004, for the same purpose.

In 2005, after the winner of the online game finished a free trip following the travels of Luper, an additional final feature, A Life In Suitcases (subtitled The Tulse Luper Journey) was released.

Cast

 JJ Feild as Tulse Luper / Floris Creps
 Raymond J. Barry as Stephan Figura
 Michèle Bernier as Sophie van Osterhaus
 Valentina Cervi as Cissie Colpitts
 Caroline Dhavernas as Passion Hockmeister
 Anna Galiena as Madame Plens
 Deborah Harry as Fastidieux
 Steven Mackintosh as Günther Zeloty
 Jordi Mollà as Jan Palmerion
 Ornella Muti as Mathilde Figura
 Isabella Rossellini as Madame Moitessier
 Ronald Pickup as Monsieur Moitessier
 Franka Potente as Trixie Boudain
 Francesco Salvi as Paul / Pierre
 Nigel Terry as Sesame Esau
 Ana Torrent as Ana Torrent
 Kevin Tighe as William Gottschalk
 Scot Williams as Percy Hockmeister
 Yorick van Wageningen as Julian Lephrenic
 Jack Wouterse as Erik van Hoyten
 Tom Bower as Sheriff Fender
 Michael Culkin as Luper Authority
 Joanna David as May Jacoby
 Francesca Ventura as a lover
 Benjamin Davies as Hercule
 Keram Malicki-Sánchez as Virgil de Selincourt
 Tanya Moodie as Guam Ravillion
 Vincent Grass as Mrs. Moitessier's Father	
 Barbara Tarbuck as Mrs. Fender
 Renata Litvinova as Constance Bulitsky
 Irina Brazgovka as Katerina

Structure
The project has been described by Greenaway as 'a personal history of uranium' and the 'autobiography of a professional prisoner'. It is structured around 92 suitcases allegedly belonging to Luper, 92 being the atomic number of uranium. The number was also used by Greenaway in the formal structure of his earlier work (most notably The Falls). Each suitcase contains an object 'to represent the world'. Collectively they advance or contribute to the biography of the fictional character Tulse Luper, although in many cases the contents are more metaphorical than real.

The world according to Tulse Luper
Tulse Luper, a fictional character, is said to have been born in 1911 in Newport, South Wales and disappeared into ever more obscure prisons and jails in Russia and the Far East in the 1970s. He would have been 100 in 2011. The project alleges that this extraordinary man archived his entire life in 92 suitcases. His imagined life is shrouded in mystery, but it seems that Luper has been present at some of the key historical events of the 20th century, including the first nuclear tests in New Mexico, the 1968 Paris student protests and the fall of the Berlin Wall in 1989. Although Luper is said to have spent much of his life as a 'professional prisoner', he has collect a large number of objects and stored them in suitcases. In a way, these suitcases represent the world according to Tulse Luper. Luper is still presumed to be alive somewhere in the world – probably in a prison somewhere.

Style
The visual style of the three feature films is unorthodox, even compared to other Greenaway films. They are presented as source material and 'background story' for the suitcases which were shown online and in physical exhibitions, and hence are perhaps intended as an audio/video pastiche.

In many scenes multiple takes, different angles, or identical copies of the same footage are displayed simultaneously within the frame, either superimposed or in discrete boxes. Multiple images are typically offset in time from one another, with a corresponding delay in audio. At times, a written representation of the script also scrolls across the screen as it is performed. The overall effect is similar to that of Greenaway's film The Pillow Book, but here the effects are largely devoted to narrator-type characters, or to primary characters commenting on or responding to the action.

The character Tulse Luper has been featured (though rarely seen) in several of Peter Greenaway's earlier film works. In The Tulse Luper Suitcases a substantial portion of Greenaway's output is  presented as if filmed by Luper. Other connections to previous Greenaway films include the character Cissie Colpitts, who also appeared in the 1988 feature Drowning By Numbers and the 1978 short Vertical Features Remake as well as in The Falls from the same year. Tulse Luper, like Greenaway himself, is presented as a keeper of extensive lists and catalogues, which serve as a sort of prism through which everything is seen. The most notable instance of this in the project is a collection of 1,001 stories which parallel The Book of One Thousand and One Nights in Arabic literature. The character Martino Knockavelli makes his first appearance here as a plump Italian schoolboy.

Analysis 
An entire issue of the online journal Image and Narrative: The Online Magazine of the Visual Narrative, Issue #12 is dedicated to study, analyze, deconstruct, and explain Greenaway's project.

Tulse Luper Suitcases Exhibition
Between 2004-11, a physical exhibition attached to the project was shown at galleries in Ghent (Belgium), Compton Verney, Warwickshire (United Kingdom), Fort Asperen (Netherlands) and São Paulo (Brazil). The exhibition explored the connections between objects, events and ideas. As a writer, collector, cataloguer and professional list-maker, the character Luper is shown to be fascinated by traces, systems, maps, numbers and artifacts. At the heart of the exhibition is the collection of 92 suitcases that Luper supposedly abandoned on his travels. It also included live performers, film and audio installations. 

The exhibition explored the interests and life of the elusive Luper, giving partial clues to his existence, his obsessions, the people he met and the places he visited. A multimedia encyclopedia emerged, through objects and audiovisual representations of life in the atomic age. Each exhibition site-specific, offering the audience, through modern technology, a unique look at Luper's perceptions during his travels.

The project was structured as an open work, with contributions from fab websites and other sources.  In 2007 in São Paulo, at the Videobrasil Festival, an artist (Thaís de Almeida Prado) created a performance, especially for the Tulse Luper Suitcases exhibition. The project called "The Sleeper who ..." (A Adormecida que ...]) generated new components such as a diary, a blog, videos, and photographs of the performer, as well as interaction with the public through letters.

References

Further reading

External links 
www.petergreenaway.info
Official Site
TTLS page at Wayne's Peter Greenaway website
 The Tulse Luper Journey – A massive internet game to coincide with the whole Tulse Luper project. Players are required to assemble a 92-minute movie from "layers" obtained by completing short puzzles/games, each which then open one of 92 suitcases containing a piece of the 92 minute movie.

2003 films
Avant-garde and experimental film series
Films directed by Peter Greenaway
British independent films
Multimedia works
Films shot in Almería
2000s British films